Dugandžići is a village in the municipality of Olovo, Bosnia and Herzegovina.

Demographics 
According to the 2013 census, its population was 24, with 23 living in the Olovo part and just 1 in the Sokolac part.

References

Populated places in Olovo